Ara Hamparsum (born 7 July 1952) is a former Iraqi football forward who played for Iraq in the 1978 Asian Games.

Ara played for the national team from 1975 to 1979.

References

Iraqi footballers
Iraq international footballers
Living people
Association football forwards
Footballers at the 1978 Asian Games
1952 births
Asian Games competitors for Iraq